Cardano al Campo is a town and comune (municipality) located in the province of Varese, in the Lombardy region of northern Italy.

Cardano al Campo is located strategically for its economy, since it can be found at only 2 km from Milan-Malpensa Airport. Apart from that, the town is distant 35 km from Milan, being an affluent suburban town of the Milan metropolitan area .

Origins of the name
The name of the town is strictly connected to various historical events, as suggested by historians.
 
The different assumptions considered:
- carduus, a genus of flowering plants;
-kar, a rock or a rocky terrain.

Main Sight

Religious Architecture
Church of Sant'Anastasio Martire

Twin towns
 Stigliano, Italy
 Zarautz, Spain

References

External links

 Cardano al Campo 

Cities and towns in Lombardy